Up-and-down procedure (or method) for toxicology tests in medicine is an alternative to the  test, in which animals are used for acute toxicity testing. It requires fewer animals to achieve similar accuracy as the LD50 test because animals are dosed one at a time. If the first animal survives, the dose for the next animal is increased; if it dies, the dose is decreased. It is usual to observe each animal for 1 or 2 days before dosing the next animal, however, surviving animals should be monitored for  7 days in case of delayed death. The up-and-down method is not recommended where deaths beyond 2 days are the norm. The U.S. Food and Drug Administration has begun to approve non-animal alternatives.

References

Further reading

Toxicology tests